Marina Sirtis (born 29 March 1955) is an English actress. She is best known for her role as Counselor Deanna Troi on the television series Star Trek: The Next Generation and four Star Trek feature films, as well as other appearances in the Star Trek franchise.

Early life
Marina Sirtis was born in Hackney, London, the daughter of Greek parents, Despina, a tailor's assistant, and John Sirtis. She was brought up in Harringay, North London. When she was three years old, Sirtis says, the teenage sons of her babysitter sexually molested her. Sirtis suffered from an eating disorder, which emerged due to the trauma of the assault. After suffering from the disorder for 20 years, she went into therapy in the 1990s and was able to manage the trauma and learn to eat healthily again.

While still in secondary school, Sirtis secretly auditioned for drama school against her parents' wishes, ultimately being accepted to the Guildhall School of Music and Drama.

In 1976, at the age of 21, Sirtis graduated from Guildhall and began her career by joining the Connaught Theatre.

In 1986, Sirtis immigrated to the United States, settling in Los Angeles to boost her career. She later became a naturalized US citizen.

Career

Early work

Sirtis started her career as a member of the repertory company at the Connaught Theatre, Worthing, West Sussex, in 1976. Directed by Nic Young, she appeared in Joe Orton's What the Butler Saw and as Ophelia in Hamlet.

Before her role in Star Trek, Sirtis was featured in supporting roles in several films. In the 1983, Faye Dunaway film, The Wicked Lady, she engaged in a whip fight with Dunaway. In the Charles Bronson sequel Death Wish 3, Sirtis' character is a rape victim. In the film Blind Date, she appears as a sex worker who is murdered by a madman.

Other early works include numerous guest-starring roles on British television series. Sirtis appeared in Raffles (1977), Who Pays the Ferryman (1977), Hazell (1978), Minder (1979), the Jim Davidson sitcom Up the Elephant and Round the Castle (1985), and The Return of Sherlock Holmes (1986). She also played the flight attendant in a 1979 Cinzano Bianco television commercial starring Leonard Rossiter and Joan Collins, in which Collins was splattered with drink.

Star Trek

Star Trek: The Next Generation
In 1986, Sirtis relocated to the United States. When casting Star Trek: The Next Generation, Gene Roddenberry was inspired to ask Sirtis, whose appearance he considered "exotic", to audition for a role after seeing the film Aliens with Bob Justman, which featured the prominent Latina character Vasquez, played by Jenette Goldstein. Sirtis and Denise Crosby initially tried out for each other's eventual roles on The Next Generation. Sirtis' character was going to be named Lt. Macha Hernandez, the Security Chief. Gene Roddenberry decided to switch them, and Macha Hernandez became Tasha Yar. Sirtis recalls that on the day she received the call offering her the role, she was actually packing to return to Britain because her six-month visa had expired.

Deanna Troi is a half-human, half-Betazoid. Her Betazoid abilities allow her to read the emotions of others. Her position on the Enterprise-D is ship's counselor, looking after the crew's well-being and serving as trusted advisor to Captain Picard, with a position next to him on the bridge. Initially, the writers found it difficult to write for Troi and even left her out of four first-season episodes. Sirtis felt her job was in jeopardy after the first season, but was overjoyed when Roddenberry took her aside at Jonathan Frakes' wedding and told her that the season-two premiere episode would centre on Troi.

Sirtis appeared in all seven seasons of Star Trek: The Next Generation, and her character was developed from a more passive therapist to a tougher Starfleet officer. She has stated her favourite episode is season six's "Face of the Enemy", in which she is kidnapped and surgically altered to pose as a Romulan. Troi's switching to a standard Starfleet uniform in the same season in "Chain of Command" elevated the character's dignity in Sirtis' eyes, and her enthusiasm in playing her, with Sirtis commenting, "It covered up my cleavage and, consequently, I got all my brains back, because when you have a cleavage you can't have brains in Hollywood. So I got all my brains back and I was allowed to do things that I hadn't been allowed to do for five or six years. I went on away teams, I was in charge of staff, I had my pips back, I had phasers, I had all the equipment again, and it was fabulous. I was absolutely thrilled."

During her time on the show, she became close friends with her co-stars Jonathan Frakes (who played Commander Riker), Michael Dorn (Lieutenant Worf) and Brent Spiner (who played Lieutenant Commander Data). The latter cast members were groomsmen at her wedding.

She wore black-coloured contact lenses during the seven-year run of Star Trek: The Next Generation and the subsequent films because her character had black eyes.  Her own eyes are light brown.

She usually wore hairpieces for her role as Troi. Sirtis' real hair was slightly shorter and, although curly, was not as bouffant as her character's. However, Sirtis' real hair was used in the pilot episode, and also in the first six episodes of season six, in which Troi sported a more natural looking pony-tailed style. She was also asked to create an accent (described as a mixture of Eastern European and Israeli) for her character, although her natural accent is Cockney. Over time, the accent was adjusted and became more Americanized.

Other Star Trek works
Sirtis reprised her character in the feature films Star Trek Generations (1994), Star Trek: First Contact (1996), Star Trek: Insurrection (1998), and Star Trek: Nemesis (2002).

Sirtis was delighted to get the chance to do some comedy in Star Trek: First Contact and said, "I loved it because it opened the door to a different side of Troi we'd never seen before. That door has stayed open and that whole kind of wacky, zany Troi thing has continued into the next movie, which is great for me because I like to do things that are different." Sirtis stated of her role in Star Trek: Nemesis, "I sort of had an inkling that I was going to have a good part in this film because John Logan was such a big fan of the character. So I knew that he would do her some justice."

Sirtis also appeared in Star Trek: Voyager for three episodes toward the end of the series (1999 and 2000), and the series finale of Star Trek: Enterprise (2005). She next returned to her role as Deanna Troi in 2020 in Star Trek: Picard episode "Nepenthe". She also reprised the role in "No Small Parts", the first-season finale of Star Trek: Lower Decks.

Sirtis voiced the Enterprise's computer in the web series Star Trek Continues.

Other work 
While filming Star Trek: The Next Generation, Sirtis returned to the UK during the hiatus between seasons three and four in 1990 to film a drama special entitled One Last Chance for the BBC. In 1992, she appeared in an episode of the short-lived series The Fifth Corner and had a cameo in the horror/fantasy movie Waxwork II: Lost in Time. After the end of Star Trek: The Next Generation in 1994, Sirtis continued to work regularly. Her first role was a departure from previous work, an abused wife in the series Heaven Help Us.

She provided the voice of Demona in the animated Disney television series Gargoyles for two seasons starting in 1994. Her Next Generation co-stars, Frakes (as the voice of David Xanatos), Spiner and Dorn, also lent their voices to the show. She voiced the character again for an episode of the unmade animated series Team Atlantis.

In 1996, Sirtis starred as a villainous police detective in the British made-for-television movie, Gadgetman. She played a villainess once again when she guest-starred as a race-track owner under investigation following the death of a driver in Diagnosis: Murder in 1998. The independent movie Paradise Lost, with Sirtis in a starring role, was released in 1999.

Beginning in 1999, Sirtis returned to science-fiction television in a number of roles starting with The Outer Limits. The same year, she appeared in Earth: Final Conflict, originally created by Gene Roddenberry. In 2000, she played a Russian scientist in Stargate SG-1. Sirtis was interviewed in the October 2000 issue of SFX magazine in the UK; the cover stated, "Marina Sirtis is Everywhere", also referring to her reprisal of her character Deanna Troi on Star Trek: Voyager.

In 2001, Sirtis made a highly publicised appearance on the long-running British hospital drama Casualty. She played a politician with controversial views on the National Health Service. When she meets with a man with whom she is having an affair at a hotel, she is caught in an explosion. She appeared in the made-for-television movies Terminal Error in 2002 and Net Games in 2003. Also in 2003, she guest-starred in the ABC series Threat Matrix playing a biological-weapons scientist from Iraq.

Sirtis starred in the movie Spectres in 2004, and at ShockerFest International Film Festival, she won the best actress award.

Sirtis had a minor role in the Academy Award-winning ensemble film Crash as the wife of the Persian shopkeeper. Following this, she played another Middle Eastern role on the series The Closer in 2005. In 2006, she had a three-episode recurring role as a love match-maker on Girlfriends, and she guest-starred in Without a Trace.
In 2007, Sirtis starred in the SyFy channel production of Grendel, where she played Queen Onela. Independent movies Trade Routes, The Deep Below, and Lesser of Three Evils were released. She provided the voice for Matriarch Benezia in the critically acclaimed video game Mass Effect on Xbox 360, PlayStation 3 and PC.

In 2008, she made a guest appearance in an episode of the Casualty spin-off show Holby City. The same year, the sci-fi/drama movie Inalienable, written by Star Trek alumnus Walter Koenig, was released. Sirtis said of her role, "I actually play the Deputy Attorney General of the United States, so I'm a bad guy, a mean lawyer, which was fantastic."

The direct-to-DVD sequels Green Street 2 and The Grudge 3, featuring Sirtis, were released in 2009. She co-starred in the British movie 31 North 62 East as the prime minister's top aide; it had a limited theatrical release in the UK. Sirtis guest-starred in the first episode of the short-lived hospital drama Three Rivers. She returned to SyFy in December 2009 in the disaster movie Annihilation Earth.

In 2010, Sirtis guest-starred as a Swiss doctor in two episodes of ABC Family's Make It or Break It. In May 2010, Sirtis announced that she would be providing the voice for comic-book villainess Queen Bee in the Young Justice animated series. She provided her voice for a number of episodes from 2011 until its cancellation in 2013. In March 2011, Sirtis guest-starred on an episode of Grey's Anatomy. She played an Iranian mother who was at the hospital to participate in a medical trial for Alzheimer's disease.

In 2012, the vampire movie Speed Demons, in which Sirtis co-starred, was released to pay-per-view services. The same year, she played a fortune teller in the Castlevania fan-made series posted on YouTube. She accepted a recurring role as director of Mossad on NCIS. Her character, Orli Elbaz, succeeds Eli David (portrayed by Michael Nouri) and was introduced in the season-10 episode "Berlin", which aired in April 2013. She subsequently appeared in the second episode of season 11, which aired in early October 2013, and in the season 13 finale "Family First".

In 2014, she co-starred in the SyFy channel horror movie Finders Keepers. The following year, she appeared in the British film A Dark Reflection, and in 2016, Sirtis starred in the Hallmark Channel movie My Summer Prince. In 2019, Sirtis made her London West End stage debut in Dark Sublime, playing the character of Marianne, a freelance actor and now-forgotten icon of a British sci-fi TV show, whose encounter with a fan changes both of their lives.

Personal life
Sirtis married Michael Lamper, an actor and rock guitarist, in 1992. Lamper died in his sleep on 7 December 2019. In 2021, Sirtis moved back to London, citing Lamper's death, growing tensions in America, and a desire for career opportunities in British film and television.

Filmography

Film
{| class="wikitable"
|-
! Year !! Title !! Role !! Note
|-
| 1983  ||  The Wicked Lady || Jackson's Girl ||
|-
| 1983 ||   Space Riders (1983 film)|| Girl In Porsche||
|-
| 1984  ||  Blind Date || Hooker ||
|-
| 1985  ||  Death Wish 3 ||  Maria Rodriguez ||
|-
| 1992  ||  Waxwork II: Lost in Time || Gloria ||
|-
| 1994  ||  Star Trek Generations || rowspan=3 | Counselor Deanna Troi ||
|-
| 1996  ||  Star Trek: First Contact ||
|-
| 1998  ||  Star Trek: Insurrection ||
|-
| 1999  ||  Paradise Lost || Dr. Christine DuMaurier ||
|-
| 2002  ||  Star Trek: Nemesis || Counselor Deanna Troi ||
|-
| 2002  ||  Terminal Error || Alex ||
|-
| 2004  ||  Spectres || Laura Lee ||
|-
| 2004  ||  Crash || Shereen ||
|-
| 2007  ||  Fist of the Warrior || Mary ||
|-
| 2007  ||  The Deep Below || Sarah ||
|-
| 2007  ||  Game of Life || Mrs. Rafiki ||
|-
| 2008  ||  InAlienable || Attorney Barry ||
|-
| 2009  ||  Green Street 2: Stand Your Ground || Veronica Mavis ||
|-
| 2009  ||  The Grudge 3 || Gretchen ||
|-
| 2009  ||  31 North 62 East || Sarah Webber ||
|-
| 2014  ||  Finders Keepers  ||  Janine ||
|-
| 2014  ||  Electric Boogaloo: The Wild, Untold Story of Cannon Films  || Herself ||
|-
| 2015  ||  A Dark Reflection || Maggie Jaspar ||
|-
| 2016  ||  Little Dead Rotting Hood || Esmerelda Winfield / Grandmother ||
|-
| 2017  ||  The Assassin's Apprentice || Miranda ||
|-
| 2017  ||  My Christmas Prince || Felicia Holst ||
|-
| 2018  ||  5th Passenger || Alana ||
|-
| 2020  ||  Max Winslow and the House of Secrets || H.A.V.E.N ||
|-
| 2020  ||  Debt Collectors || Mal Reese ||
|}

Television

Voice acting
 Griffin and Sabine audio series (1993) ... Sabine
 Gargoyles (1994–97) ... Demona
 Mass Effect (Video game) (2007) ... Matriarch Benezia
 Young Justice (2010–12, 2018) ... Queen Bee
 Pilgrim of Eternity (2013) ... Computer (recreation of the Computer from Star Trek: The Original Series)
 Adventure Time (2013) ... Samantha (Episode "The Pit")
 XCOM 2: War of the Chosen (Video Game) (2017) ... Elena Dragunova
 OK K.O.! Let's Be Heroes (2017) ... Cosma
 Elite: Dangerous (2018) ... COVAS Carina
  The Worlds of Doctor Who: The Year of Martha Jones'' (2021) ... Karen

AudioBooks

References

Further reading

External links

 
 
 
 
 
 
 

1955 births
20th-century American actresses
21st-century American actresses
20th-century English actresses
21st-century English actresses
Actresses from London
Alumni of the Guildhall School of Music and Drama
American people of Greek descent
American film actresses
American television actresses
American voice actresses
English emigrants to the United States
English people of Greek descent
English film actresses
English television actresses
English voice actresses
Living people
People from Harringay
People from the London Borough of Hackney
People with acquired American citizenship